Beygom Qaleh (also Romanized as Beygom Qal‘eh; also known as Bāim Qal‘eh, Beygūm Qal‘eh, and Bīm Qal‘eh) is a Kurdish village in Beygom Qaleh Rural District of the Central District of Naqadeh County, West Azerbaijan province, Iran. At the 2006 National Census, its population was 1,661 in 384 households. The following census in 2011 counted 1,680 people in 495 households. The latest census in 2016 showed a population of 1,727 people in 497 households; it was the largest village in its rural district.

References 

Naqadeh County

Populated places in West Azerbaijan Province

Populated places in Naqadeh County